Douglas Dale (born in Barrington, Illinois) is an American actor and comedian, best known for hosting the Comedy Central series TV Funhouse which was written and Directed by Robert Smigel. He originally met Robert Smigel when they were roommates in Chicago. They were creators and cast members of the comedy group All You Can Eat. Their biggest success with that group was the show "All You Can Eat and the Temple of Doom".

Dale was also involved in the Happy Happy Good Show, a Chicago sketch show featuring Robert Smigel, Bob Odenkirk and Conan O'Brien. Dale was also seen on the series Murphy Brown and Who's the Boss, and during the early 1990s he appeared in various sketches on Late Night with Conan O'Brien, most notably as the "Guy Next Door." He also appeared on Saturday Night Live as various voices in the TV Funhouse cartoons, and more recently, he did voice-overs for Hotel Transylvania.

In addition to acting, Dale is Vice President of All Children's Theatre in Parsippany, New Jersey. There he teaches children stage performances ranging from stand-up to Musical Theatre.

References

External links
 
 Your Pal Doug

Year of birth missing (living people)
Living people
American male comedians
American male television actors
People from Barrington, Illinois
Comedians from Illinois